The Jones–Shafroth Act —also known as the Jones Act of Puerto Rico, Jones Law of Puerto Rico, or as the Puerto Rican Federal Relations Act of 1917— was an Act of the United States Congress, signed by President Woodrow Wilson on March 2, 1917. The act superseded the Foraker Act and granted U.S. citizenship to anyone born in Puerto Rico on or after April 11, 1899. It also created the Senate of Puerto Rico, established a bill of rights, and authorized the election of a Resident Commissioner (previously appointed by the President) to a four-year term. The act also exempted Puerto Rican bonds from federal, state, and local taxes regardless of where the bondholder resides.

Impetus
The impetus for this legislation came from a complex of local and mainland interests. Puerto Ricans lacked internationally recognized citizenship, but the local council was wary of "imposing citizenship." Luis Muñoz Rivera, the Resident Commissioner in Washington, argued against US citizenship, giving several speeches in the House of Representatives. On 5 May 1916 he demanded:

Rep. William Atkinson Jones, (D-Virginia), chairman of the House Committee on Insular Affairs, and Sen. John Shafroth, (D-Colorado), chairman of the Committee on Pacific Islands and Puerto Rico, sponsored the legislation which bears their names.

Major features
This Act made all citizens of Puerto Rico U.S. citizens and reformed the system of government in Puerto Rico. In some respects, the governmental structure paralleled that of a state of the United States.  Powers were separated among executive, judicial, and legislative branches. The law also recognized certain civil rights through a bill of rights to be observed by the government of Puerto Rico (although trial by jury was not among them).

Citizenship

According to Public Law 414 of June 27, 1952 SEC.302:§1402. Persons born in Puerto Rico on or after April 11, 1899

All persons born in Puerto Rico on or after April 11, 1899, and prior to January 13, 1941, subject to the jurisdiction of the United States, residing on January 13, 1941, in Puerto Rico or another territory over which the United States exercises rights of sovereignty and not citizens of the United States under any other Act, are declared to be citizens of the United States as of January 13, 1941. All persons born in Puerto Rico on or after January 13, 1941, and subject to the jurisdiction of the United States, are citizens of the United States at birth.
(June 27, 1952, ch. 477, title III, ch. 1, §302, 66 Stat. 236.)The Act abolished racial restrictions found in United States immigration and naturalization statutes going back to the Naturalization Act of 1790. The 1952 Act retained a quota system for nationalities and regions. Eventually, the Act established a preference system that determined which ethnic groups were desirable immigrants and placed great importance on labor qualifications. The Act defined three types of immigrants: immigrants with special skills or who had relatives of U.S. citizens, who were exempt from quotas and who were to be admitted without restrictions; average immigrants whose numbers were not supposed to exceed 270,000 per year; and refugees.

It expanded the definition of the "United States" for nationality purposes, which already included Puerto Rico and the Virgin Islands, to add Guam. Persons born in these territories on or after December 24, 1952, acquire U.S. citizenship at birth on the same terms as persons born in other parts of the United States.

Residents of the island were granted United States citizenship and allowed to reject it voluntarily within six months of the act being established. Of the almost 1.2 million residents on the island, only 288 rejected it.

Legislators 

The Act created a bicameral local legislature composed of a Senate with 19 members and a House of Representatives with 39 members. The legislature was to be elected by universal male suffrage for a term of four years. Bills passed by the legislature could be vetoed by the governor, but his veto could be overridden by a two-thirds vote, in which case the President of the United States would make the final decision.

Matters relating to franchises and concessions were vested in a Public Service Commission, consisting of the heads of the executive departments, the auditor, and two elected commissioners. A Resident Commissioner representing Puerto Rico as a non-voting delegate of the U.S. House of Representatives was elected by popular vote to a four-year term.

Executive branch
Under the Act, six executive departments were constituted: Justice, Finance, Interior, Education, Agriculture, Labor, and Health. The governor, the attorney-general, and the commissioner of education were appointed by the President with the approval of the U.S. Senate; the heads of the remaining departments were appointed by the governor of Puerto Rico, subject to the approval of the Puerto Rican Senate.

The Governor of Puerto Rico was to be appointed by the President of the United States, not elected. All cabinet officials had to be approved by the United States Senate, and the United States Congress had the power to veto any law passed by the Puerto Rican Legislature. Washington maintained control over fiscal and economic matters and exercised authority over mail services, immigration, defense, and other basic governmental matters. Puerto Rico was not given electoral votes in the election of U.S. President, because the Constitution of the United States of America allows only full-fledged states to have electoral votes.

Triple tax exemption
Section 3 of the act also exempted Puerto Rican bonds from federal, state, and local taxes regardless of where the bondholder resides. This has made Puerto Rican bonds extremely attractive to municipal investors as they may inure from holding a bond issued by a state or municipality different from the one where they reside. This is because municipal bonds that enjoy triple tax exemption are typically granted such exemption solely for bondholders that reside in the state that issues them.

Effects

Conscription 

Before the Jones–Shafroth Act, insular Puerto Ricans were not citizens of the United States. Subsequent to the Act, they immediately became U.S. citizens. The act also extended almost all U.S. laws to have the same force and effect in Puerto Rico as in the United States (the only laws excepted were those concerning internal revenues) including the National Defense Act of 1916 which established the composition of the U.S. military. Two months after Congress passed the Jones–Shafroth Act, that same Congress enacted the Selective Service Act of 1917 which based conscription "upon liability to military service of all male citizens."  Through its passage, the Jones–Shafroth Act—via a combination of citizenship and the expansion of U.S. laws to Puerto Rico, including the aforementioned National Defense Act—imposed mandatory conscription into the U.S. military on Puerto Ricans, precisely at the moment that the United States entered World War I. As a result, more than 18,000 Puerto Ricans served in the U.S. armed forces during World War I.

Subsequent legislation
Portions of the Jones Act were superseded in 1948, after which the Governor was popularly elected.  In 1948, U.S. Congress mandated Puerto Rico to draft its own Constitution which, when ratified by the electorate and implemented in 1952, provided greater autonomy as a Commonwealth.

Notes

References

Further reading

Cabranes, Jose. Citizenship and the American Empire (1979) (legislative history of the statute, reprinted from the University of Pennsylvania Law Review).
Gatell, Frank Otto. "The Art of the Possible: Luis Muñoz Rivera and the Puerto Rico Bill." Americas 1960 17(1): 1-20.
Morales Carrion, Arturo . Puerto Rico: A Political and Cultural History (1984).
Picó, Fernando. Historia general de Puerto Rico. Río Piedras: Ediciones Huracán, (1986).

External links
Jones-Shafroth Act - The Library of Congress
Spanish text
Full text of the Jones Act

Political history of Puerto Rico
United States federal immigration and nationality legislation
United States federal territory and statehood legislation
1917 in American law
Legal history of Puerto Rico
United States nationality law